"Everytime You Touch Me" is a song by American electronica musician Moby, released on February 13, 1995, as the third single from his third studio album, Everything Is Wrong (1995). Guest vocals on the song are performed by Rozz Morehead and Kochie Banton. It was a number one hit in Finland, and a top 20 hit in Ireland, the Netherlands, Scotland, and on the Canadian RPM Dance/Urban chart. In the UK, the song peaked at number 28.

Release 
Before the release of the "Everytime You Touch Me" single, a remix competition was held. The winning remix, made by Jude Sebastian, is featured as track three on the single. In 2000, a 12-inch single was pressed in honour of the other remix contestants.

A related promotional EP entitled Disk was released by Elektra in 1995. It was issued in an Enhanced CD with both standard audio tracks, music videos, and CD-ROM content. The disc has a program which allows users to remix "Everytime You Touch Me" and view QuickTime interview clips.

Critical reception 
Steve Baltin from Cash Box complimented the song as a "delightful disco number". Barry Walters for Spin wrote, "Soul sister Rozz Morehead rides the hyper-house beats like an old-school disco diva on the should-be dance floor smash "Everytime You Touch Me"."

Music video 
The accompanying music video for "Everytime You Touch Me" was directed by Julie Hermelin. She had previously directed the video for "Feeling So Real".

Track listing 

 12-inch single 
 "Everytime You Touch Me"  – 5:23
 "Everytime You Touch Me"  – 7:01
 "Everytime You Touch Me"  – 5:25
 "Everytime You Touch Me"  – 5:08
 "Everytime You Touch Me"  – 5:54

 12-inch single 
 "Everytime You Touch Me"  – 6:47
 "Everytime You Touch Me"  – 6:43
 "Everytime You Touch Me"  – 5:38
 "Everytime You Touch Me"  – 7:01

 12-inch single 
 "Everytime You Touch Me"  – 5:08
 "Everytime You Touch Me"  – 5:54
 "Everytime You Touch Me"  – 5:25
 "Everytime You Touch Me"  – 6:33
 "Everytime You Touch Me"  – 5:26

 CD single 
 "Everytime You Touch Me"  – 3:55
 "The Blue Light of the Underwater Sun" – 4:22
 "Everytime You Touch Me"  – 7:01
 "Everytime You Touch Me"  – 5:54

 CD single 
 "Everytime You Touch Me"  – 5:23
 "Everytime You Touch Me"  – 5:25
 "Everytime You Touch Me"  – 5:08
 "Everytime You Touch Me"  – 4:28
 "Everytime You Touch Me"  – 5:21
 "Everytime You Touch Me"  – 6:25

Charts

References

External links
 

1995 singles
1995 songs
Moby songs
Songs written by Moby
Mute Records singles
Number-one singles in Finland